Corozal Bay is an inlet of Chetumal Bay, indenting northern Belize. Several resort areas are located on the coast of the bay, most notably Corozal Town. The New River (Belize) flows north into the bay. The town of Consejo is located north-northeast of the bay, on the much larger Chetumal Bay. The Mayan ruins of Cerros are located on the bay.

Bays of Belize